38th Parallel was a Christian rock band formed in Ames, Iowa. Before being signed they received extensive airplay in Iowa markets alongside other CCM Artists. Unknown to them, they were entered into a talent search contest for Christian music giant Word Records created by former A&R Alvin V. Williams. Alvin Williams signed the group to Word Records, but they soon signed and released their first project on, Squint Entertainment.

Their name is a play on the 38th parallel north, which divides North Korea from South Korea. Their first album, Turn the Tides, was released in 2002, following the band's nationwide tour with artists Skillet and The Benjamin Gate. The album received a Dove Award nomination in 2003 for Rock Album of the Year.

Following the disbandment of 38th Parallel, vocalist Mark Jennings, guitarist Jason Munday, and drummer Aaron Nordyke formed the Harry Potter-themed electronica band Ministry of Magic.

In 2005, 38th Parallel made available the demo tracks for their second album that were never finished or released.

On August 2, 2006, band member Mark Jennings announced, via the band's MySpace blog, that it is unlikely that 38th Parallel will release another album. The decision was influenced by shifting priorities in the personal lives of the members such as marriage.

On June 16, 2007, 4 out of the 5 members of 38th Parallel played 5 songs at Bash on the Farm in Garner, IA.

Currently, Mark Jennings, Jason Munday, and Aaron Nordyke are all still involved with the wizard rock band called Ministry of Magic, along with Luke Conard, Ryan Seiler, and Jeremy Jennings. They currently have four albums (The Tri Wizard LP, Goodbye Privet Drive, Onward and Upward, Magic is Might, and "Songs from Gringott's Vault") and perform when possible.

Former members 
 Mark Jennings — vocals
 Nate Rippke — vocals
 Shane Moe — guitars 2001–2003
 Jason Munday — guitars since 2003
 Jeff Barton — bass guitar
 Aaron Nordyke — drums
 Erik Holt — guitars 1998-2000

Discography
2001: Let Go (EP)
2002: Turn the Tides

References

External links
Live interview
Biography
Interview - circa 2002

2000 establishments in Iowa
2006 disestablishments in Iowa
Alternative rock groups from Iowa
American nu metal musical groups
Christian rock groups from Iowa
Musical groups disestablished in 2006
Musical groups established in 2000
Rap rock groups